Habenaria roxburghii, commonly known as Roxburgh's habenaria, malle leena gadda and as chekku dumpa in Telugu, is a species of orchid found in southern India. The species is usually found in shady places in the undergrowth of forests and is found in the Eastern Ghats.

Taxonomy and naming
Habenaria roxburghii was first formally described in 1976 by Dan Henry Nicolson and the description was published in the book "Flora of Hassan District, Karnataka, India".

References

External links 

roxburghii
Plants described in 1976